The United Nations Commission on Human Rights was a functional commission within the overall framework of the United Nations from 1946 until it was replaced by the UN Human Rights Council in 2006. It was a subsidiary body of the UN Economic and Social Council (ECOSOC), which elected members through the mechanism of the United Nations Regional Groups.

Membership by regional group (UNCHR) until 2005

African Group

Asian Group

Eastern European Group

Latin American and Caribbean Group

Western European and Others Group

Membership by regional group (UNHRC) From 2006

African Group

Asian Group

Eastern European Group

Latin American and Caribbean Group

Western European and Others Group

Non-members

The list is a summary of all countries that have never been a member of United Nations Human Rights Council.

See also
 United Nations Regional Groups
 List of United Nations member states
 List of members of the United Nations Security Council
 List of members of the United Nations Economic and Social Council

References

External links
 Official Document System of the United Nations – source of UN electoral records

Commission on Human Rights